Daniel Muñoz-de la Nava and Simone Vagnozzi were the defending champions, but Spanish player decided not to participate. Vagnozzi partnered up with Alessio di Mauro, but lost in the semifinals.

Yuri Schukin and Antonio Veić won the title, defeating Hsieh Cheng-peng and Lee Hsin-han 6–7(5–7), 7–5, [10–8] in the final.

Seeds

Draw

Draw

References
 Main Draw

Tennislife Cup - Doubles
Tennislife Cup